Wadad Afifi Kadi (born November 23, 1943) is a Lebanese scholar of Arabic and Islamic civilizations and the Avalon Foundation Distinguished Service Professor Emerita of Islamic Studies in Near Eastern Languages and Civilizations at the University of Chicago.

Biography
Wadad Kadi was born in Lebanon on November 23, 1943. She earned her BA and MA in Arabic Literature at the American University of Beirut, then went on to pursue doctoral studies at the University of Tübingen in Germany, before finishing her Ph.D. at the American University of Beirut. She has taught at Yale, AUB, and the University of Chicago, as well as Harvard, Columbia, Stockholm University, and Oxford.

References

Lebanese Arabists
Living people
Place of birth missing (living people)
1943 births